Kipling is the western terminus station of Line 2 Bloor–Danforth of the Toronto subway system. The station is served by buses and subway trains operated by the Toronto Transit Commission and is adjacent to the Kipling GO Station on the Milton line of GO Transit and the Kipling Bus Terminal, where passengers can connect with MiWay and GO Transit bus services. It is located in the Islington–City Centre West neighbourhood on St. Albans Road at Aukland Road, west of the overpass of Kipling Avenue, after which the station is named. The 900 Airport Express bus route connects Kipling to the Toronto Pearson International Airport.

History 

Kipling station, in what was then the Borough of Etobicoke, officially opened on November 21, 1980—along with Kennedy station, as a pair of one-stop extensions at opposite ends of the Bloor–Danforth line—but was not opened to the public until the following day. Kipling and Kennedy were designed similarly, with both stations having an island platform that is typical of terminal stations. The outer platform walls at Kipling were originally two rows of vertical yellow vinyl slats separated by a black strip showing the station's name in Univers font. This wall treatment was replaced by off-white fitted enamelled panels using the traditional Toronto Subway font with black trim with smaller lettering along the top in a 2017 renovation, evoking the older stations along the line.

In 1999, this station became accessible with the addition of elevators, one of the first accessible stations in the City.

As a result of the initial lack of density near the station, and its location near a hydro substation, it was originally designed around commuter travel, with a large amount of parking spaces (over 1,300) and a roughed-in platform for a future light rail or light metro line, like the Scarborough RT at Kennedy.

In the early 2020s, a new regional bus terminal was built on the site of the Kipling North commuter parking lot. Serving both MiWay and GO Transit, the bus terminal opened in 2021. An underground tunnel links the subway station to the regional bus terminal, and an accessible link bridge connects to the Kipling GO Station. , 1,067 commuter parking spaces remain, located south of the station in the hydro corridor.

Facilities 
The main entrance is located at the west end of the station, with access to the GO station, commuter parking lots, and a kiss and ride area for passenger drop-off. An entrance at the east end makes the bus platform level accessible by way of a ramp, with an elevator providing a connection with the train platform below. Fares can be paid for at this station by using tokens, tickets, passes, as well as the Presto card. Currently it serves the high density residential and commercial developments that are being built, while acting as a hub for commuter travel.

Above the subway tracks on the south side of the station, opposite the bus bays on the same level, is an unfinished platform for a proposed but never-built Etobicoke RT line similar to Line 3 Scarborough.

East of the station towards , the line continues on the surface alongside the railway right-of-way which parallels Dundas Street at a distance. It crosses over Bloor Street to the north side alongside the railway tracks, then dives underground below the tracks and turns parallel to Bloor.

Kipling Yard

Currently the tail end tracks west of the station can be used to store 2 cars sets.

There were plans to establish a yard to replace Greenwood Yard (and allow Greenwood to be dedicated to the since-abandoned Relief Line) and potential exists for Metrolinx and the TTC to purchase land on the former CPR Obico Yard bounded by Shorncliffe Road and North Queen Street for a shared storage facility for subway cars and GO trains. Most of the former CPR intermodal yard, an open area not occupied by structures, is now owned by the City of Toronto and been partially used to store TTC buses since 2019 as North Queen Yard and other yards were leased out.

Surface connections 

The TTC bus platform is in the fare-paid zone, allowing passengers to quickly transfer between the subway and the following TTC bus routes:

 Some 300 Bloor–Danforth trips do not enter the bus terminal, but can be accessed at Aukland Road at Dundas Street.
 A courtesy bus operated by IKEA between Kipling station and the IKEA Etobicoke store departs from Subway Crescent north of the kiss and ride area.

Kipling Bus Terminal

A new 16-bay regional bus terminal to service MiWay buses opened on January 4, 2021. Previously, MiWay buses connected to the subway at Islington station, although route 26 Burnhamthorpe still serves that station before heading to Kipling. Since September 2021, GO Transit bus route 29, which operates between Mississauga and Guelph, also serves the station.

Passengers transferring between MiWay and the TTC subway or buses are required to pay separate fares, as are those transferring between TTC and GO Transit services, including GO Transit's Milton Line trains; however, since March 14, 2022, customers aged 13 and over who pay their GO Transit fare and transfer onto connecting MiWay buses using a Presto card are eligible for the free transfer onto MiWay without being charged an extra fare.

All MiWay routes are wheelchair-accessible and the following serve the terminal:

Beginning September 4, 2021, GO Transit's Route 29 between Guelph and Mississauga was extended to serve Kipling Bus Terminal. The bus also serves Renforth and Dixie stations on the Mississauga Transitway.

References

External links 

Line 2 Bloor–Danforth stations
Railway stations in Canada opened in 1980
Transport in Etobicoke